Shaw River may refer to:

Shaw River (Victoria), Australia
Shaw River (Western Australia)